The Sanremo Music Festival 2000 was the 50th annual Sanremo Music Festival, held at the Teatro Ariston in Sanremo, province of Imperia, in the late February 2000 and broadcast by Rai 1.

The show was presented by Fabio Fazio, supported by Luciano Pavarotti, Teo Teocoli and Inés Sastre. Composers Pino Donaggio and Giorgio Moroder and lyricist Carla Vistarini served as the artistic directors.

The winners of the Big Artists section were the group Piccola Orchestra Avion Travel with the song "Sentimento".

Jenny B won the "Newcomers" section with the song "Semplice sai", and Samuele Bersani won the Mia Martini Critics Award with the song "Replay".
 
After every night, Alessia Marcuzzi and the comedy duo Fichi D'India hosted DopoFestival, a talk show about the Festival with the participation of singers and journalists.

Participants and results

Big Artists

Newcomers

Guests

References 

Sanremo Music Festival by year
2000 in Italian music
2000 music festivals
2000 in Italian television